Andreea Mitu and Demi Schuurs were the defending champions, but both players chose not to participate.

Chang Kai-chen and Hsieh Su-wei won the title, defeating top seeds Raluca Olaru and Renata Voráčová in the final, 7–5, 6–1.

Seeds

Draw

References
Main Draw

Open de Cagnes-sur-Mer Alpes-Maritimes - Doubles